2011–12 Hong Kong Second Division League is the 98th season of Hong Kong Second Division League, a football league in Hong Kong.

Teams

Changes from last season

From Second Division League

Promoted to First Division League
 Sham Shui Po
 Mutual (expunged from the league system after withdrawing from the First Division)

Relegated to Third Division League
 Fukian
 Lucky Mile

To Second Division League

Relegated from First Division League
 Tai Chung
 HKFC

Promoted from Third Division League
 Wanchai
 Kuwn Tong

Team Overview

League table

Results table

See also
 The Hong Kong Football Association
 Hong Kong First Division League
 Hong Kong Second Division League
 Hong Kong Third Division League
 2010–11 Hong Kong Second Division League

References

External links
  The Hong Kong Football Association
  Hong Kong Football

Hong Kong Second Division League seasons
Hong
2011–12 in Hong Kong football leagues